The 2003 Auburn Tigers football team  represented Auburn University in the 2003 NCAA Division I-A football season.  Auburn began the season with high expectations, but stumbled out of the gate before finishing the season with a disappointing 8–5 record, including a 5–3 record in the SEC, good for third place in the conference's Western Division.  The Tigers, coached by Tommy Tuberville, began the season ranked #6 in both the AP Poll and the Coaches' Poll, but opened with consecutive losses to Southern California and Georgia Tech, dropping out of both polls.

The Tigers won their next four games, but remained unranked in either poll until the week after pulling a 10–3 upset win over Arkansas in Fayetteville on October 11, when they re-entered the AP Poll at #19 and the Coaches' Poll at #25.  Following a victory over Mississippi State the following week, the Tigers climbed to #17 and #21 in the two polls, but after a 31–7 loss to eventual national champion LSU on October 25, the Tigers did not appear in either poll for the remainder of the season. However, several computer rating systems did include Auburn in their final rankings.  The Tigers were ranked #17 by the BCS participating system of The New York Times, #18 by Entropy, and #19 consensus ranking by CollegeTop25.com.

After consecutive losses to Ole Miss, led by Eli Manning, and Georgia, the Tigers concluded a disappointing regular season by defeating arch rival Alabama, 28–23. In the postseason, Auburn knocked off Wisconsin 28–14 in the Music City Bowl, in Nashville, Tennessee.

The disappointment of the season led university president William Walker, athletic director David Housel, and other trustees to take a plane owned by trustee Bobby Lowder to meet in secret with Louisville Cardinals head coach Bobby Petrino about replacing Tuberville.  This occurred prior to the Alabama game, but newspapers in Montgomery and Louisville discovered the flight and broke the news. The visit caused controversy and Tuberville was ultimately retained.

Schedule

Roster

Captains

References

Auburn
Auburn Tigers football seasons
Music City Bowl champion seasons
Auburn Tigers football